Christian Lépine (born 18 September 1951) is a Canadian Catholic prelate who has been Archbishop of Montreal since 20 March 2012.

Before entering the seminary, the Quebecois Lépine studied at the Collège militaire royal de Saint-Jean and École Polytechnique de Montréal. He was ordained a priest on 7 September 1983. He studied theology at the Université de Montréal and philosophy at the Gregorian University in Rome from 1986 to 1989. He served as secretary to Cardinal Jean-Claude Turcotte from 1996 until going in 1998 to work at the Secretariat of State and later at the Congregation for Divine Worship and the Discipline of the Sacraments. From 2001 to 2006 he was a member of the formation staff of the major seminary in Montreal, before becoming pastor of Notre-Dame-des-Champs and Purification-de-la-Vierge-Marie-Bienheureuse.

On 11 July 2011, he was named Auxiliary Bishop of Montreal and Titular Bishop of Zabi, and on 10 September he was consecrated by Cardinal Turcotte. He served as Episcopal Vicar to Family and Youth.

On 20 March 2012, less than a year later, he was appointed to succeed Cardinal Turcotte, who had reached the age of retirement the previous year, and at an 8 a.m. meeting of the College of Consultors on the same day he took canonical possession of the see. A public installation took place on 27 April 2012.

References

External links

Living people
1951 births
Pontifical Gregorian University alumni
Roman Catholic archbishops of Montreal
Université de Montréal alumni
Canadian Roman Catholic archbishops
21st-century Roman Catholic archbishops in Canada